National Highway 366 (NH 366) is a  National Highway in India.

References

National highways in India
National Highways in Goa